Soho Synagogue was a "hipster" synagogue located in the SoHo neighborhood of Manhattan, New York. On September 15, 2009, The SoHo Synagogue signed a 7-year lease for the ground floor of 43 Crosby Street, located between Spring and Broome Streets. Designer Dror Benshetrit designed the synagogue space.

The SoHo Synagogue was founded in 2005 by Chabad-Lubavitch Rabbi Dovi Scheiner and his wife Esty.

References

External links 
 

Synagogues in Manhattan
SoHo, Manhattan
Hipster (contemporary subculture)